A parting gift is a gift given during parting.

Parting gift may also refer to:

"Parting Gift", a song  by American singer Fiona Apple
Parting Gifts (journal), an American literary magazine based in North Carolina